The Polonia is a EuroCity (EC) express train.  It was introduced in 1997, to supplement the existing EuroCity train, the Sobieski, on the international route between Vienna, the capital of Austria, and Warsaw, the capital of Poland, via the Czech Republic.

The train's name, Polonia, is the Latin word for "Poland".

, the northbound train, EC 102, departs from Villach Hbf, in Villach, Austria, at shortly after 09:00, and the southbound train, EC 103, departs from Warszawa Wschodnia in Warsaw at shortly after 06:00.  Both trains arrive at their destinations after a journey time, via Vienna, of approximately twelve and a half hours.

Formation (consist)
The train is composed of rolling stock of all three participating railways PKP, ČD and ÖBB and includes a dining car operated by PKP/WARS. Some of the coaches only operate on certain days between Villach and Břeclav or Bohumín.

The train is pulled by locomotives of the Siemens ES 64 U type: between Villach and Břeclav by an ÖBB 1116, between Břeclav and Warszawa by a PKP EU44.

See also

 History of rail transport in Austria
 History of rail transport in the Czech Republic
 History of rail transport in Poland
 List of EuroCity services
 List of named passenger trains of Europe

References

EuroCity
International named passenger trains
Named passenger trains of Austria
Named passenger trains of the Czech Republic
Named passenger trains of Poland
Railway services introduced in 1997